The National Commission for Refugees, Migrants, and Internally Displaced Persons (NCFRMI), formerly known as the  National Commission for Refugees (NCFR), is an agency of the Federal Government of Nigeria, established by Decree 52 of 1989 now Cap. N21, Laws of the Federation of Nigeria, 2004 (NCFRMI Act) to manage the affairs of refugees, migrants and internally displaced persons in Nigeria. The agency is one of six agencies under the supervision of the Federal Ministry of Humanitarian Affairs, Disaster Management and Social Development. It is headed by a Federal Commissioner.

Origin 
The National Commission for Refugees, Migrants, and Internally Displaced Persons was established by the Federal Government of Nigeria to fulfil the United Nations General Assembly Resolution 319(IV) under Article 35 of the United Nations 1951 Convention. The agency was formerly known for managing only refugee affairs but was later expanded in 2002 by the former President of Nigeria, Chief Olusegun Obasanjo. In 2021, President Muhammadu Buhari appointed Hon. Imaan Sulaiman-Ibrahim as the Federal Commissioner of the agency.

List of Agency Commissioners 
The past and present Federal Commissioner of the agency include:
 Imaan Sulaiman-Ibrahim
 Senator Basheer Garba Mohammed (Lado)
 Hon. Imaan Sulaiman-Ibrahim
 Hajiya  Hadiza Sani Kangiwa

References 

Human trafficking in Nigeria
Human rights organizations based in Nigeria